See Nacre for material produced by mollusks.

Mother of Pearl  (1999) is a novel by Melinda Haynes, and was chosen as an Oprah's Book Club selection, June 1999. The audio version is performed by Nana Visitor.

Plot introduction
Set in Petal, Mississippi, a small town at the close of the 1950s, this novel tells the story of the 28-year-old Even Grade, a black man who grew up an orphan, and Valuable Korner, a 15-year-old white girl, who is the daughter of the town prostitute and an unknown father. They are both separately seeking the family, love, and affection they had not had before, until their paths cross owing to their common acquaintance of loner mystic Joody Two Sun.

Characters in Mother of Pearl
Even Grade – 28-year-old black man
Valuable Korner – 15-year-old white girl
Bea – white woman, partner of Neva
Canaan Mosley – black man, older friend and neighbor of Even Grade
Enid Korner – Valuable's mother
Luvenia Korner – Valuable's grandmother, Enid's mother
Grace Johnson – black woman, caretaker of Joleb
Jackson McLain – white boy, friend of Valuable and father of Pearl
Joleb Green – white boy, friend of Valuable
Joody Two Sun – black-Indian woman, partner of Even Grade
Louise Green – aunt of Joleb
Neva – white woman, partner of Bea
Pearl – son of Valuable and Jackson
Russ (Father Russell L. Landry) – Catholic priest

1999 American novels
Novels set in Mississippi
Novels about orphans
Fiction set in the 1950s
Forrest County, Mississippi